Clogh is a small rural village in Ireland. Many local residents refer to the village as "Clough", and this is regarded as the proper spelling.

Until it was bypassed in July 2007 the village was situated on the N11 national primary route from Wexford Town to Dublin.

There is a memorial to the Battle of Tubberneering in the village. St. Luke's church (Church of Ireland), just north of the village, was built in 1831.

See also
 List of towns and villages in Ireland

References

Towns and villages in County Wexford